Deep Purple are an English rock band.

Deep Purple or deep purple may also refer to:
Deep Purple (album), 1969
Deep Purple (Sun Ra album) (1973)
"Deep Purple" (song), a 1933 song written by Peter DeRose and recorded in 1963 by Nino Tempo & April Stevens
certain shades of purple

See also
The Deep Purple (disambiguation)